

J07A 	Bacterial vaccines

J07AC Anthrax vaccines
J07AC01 Anthrax antigen

J07AD Brucellosis vaccines
J07AD01 Brucella antigen

J07AE Cholera vaccines
J07AE01 Cholera, inactivated, whole cell
J07AE02 Cholera, live attenuated
J07AE51 Cholera, combinations with typhoid vaccine, inactivated, whole cell

J07AF Diphtheria vaccines
J07AF01 Diphtheria toxoid

J07AG Haemophilus influenzae B vaccines
J07AG01 Hemophilus influenzae B, purified antigen conjugated
J07AG51 Hemophilus influenzae B, combinations with toxoids
J07AG52 Hemophilus influenzae B, combinations with pertussis and toxoids
J07AG53 Hemophilus influenzae B, combinations with meningococcus C, conjugated
J07AG54 Haemophilus influenza B, combinations with meningococcus C,Y, conjugated

J07AH Meningococcal vaccines
J07AH01 Meningococcus A, purified polysaccharides antigen
J07AH02 Other meningococcal monovalent purified polysaccharides antigen
J07AH03 Meningococcus A, C, bivalent purified polysaccharides antigen
J07AH04 Meningococcus A, C, Y, W-135, tetravalent purified polysaccharides antigen
J07AH05 Other meningococcal polyvalent purified polysaccharides antigen
J07AH06 Meningococcus B, outer membrane vesicle vaccine
J07AH07 Meningococcus C, purified polysaccharides antigen conjugated
J07AH08 Meningococcus A, C, Y, W-135, tetravalent purified polysaccharides antigen conjugated
J07AH09 Meningococcus B, multicomponent vaccine
J07AH10 Meningococcus A, purified polysaccharides antigen conjugated

J07AJ Pertussis vaccines
J07AJ01 Pertussis, inactivated, whole cell
J07AJ02 Pertussis, purified antigen
J07AJ51 Pertussis, inactivated, whole cell, combinations with toxoids
J07AJ52 Pertussis, purified antigen, combinations with toxoids

J07AK Plague vaccines
J07AK01 Plague, inactivated, whole cell

J07AL Pneumococcal vaccines
J07AL01 Pneumococcus, purified polysaccharides antigen
J07AL02 Pneumococcus, purified polysaccharides antigen conjugated
J07AL52 Pneumococcus purified polysaccharides antigen and Haemophilus influenzae, conjugated

J07AM Tetanus vaccines
J07AM01 Tetanus toxoid
J07AM51 Tetanus toxoid, combinations with diphtheria toxoid
J07AM52 Tetanus toxoid, combinations with tetanus immunoglobulin

J07AN Tuberculosis vaccines
J07AN01 Tuberculosis, live attenuated

J07AP Typhoid vaccines
J07AP01 Typhoid, oral, live attenuated
J07AP02 Typhoid, inactivated, whole cell
J07AP03 Typhoid, purified polysaccharide antigen
J07AP10 Typhoid, combinations with paratyphi types

J07AR Typhus (exanthematicus) vaccines
J07AR01 Typhus exanthematicus, inactivated, whole cell

J07AX Other bacterial vaccines
J07AX01 Leptospira vaccines

J07B Viral vaccines

J07BA Encephalitis vaccines
J07BA01 Encephalitis, tick-borne, inactivated, whole virus
J07BA02 Encephalitis, Japanese, inactivated, whole virus
J07BA03 Encephalitis, Japanese, live attenuated

J07BB Influenza vaccines
J07BB01 Influenza inactivated, whole virus
J07BB02 Influenza, purified antigen
J07BB03 Influenza, live attenuated
J07BB04 Influenza, virus like particles

J07BC Hepatitis vaccines
J07BC01 Hepatitis B, purified antigen
J07BC02 Hepatitis A, inactivated, whole virus
J07BC20 Combinations

J07BD Measles vaccines
J07BD01 Measles, live attenuated
J07BD51 Measles, combinations with mumps, live attenuated
J07BD52 Measles, combinations with mumps and rubella, live attenuated
J07BD53 Measles, combinations with rubella, live attenuated
J07BD54 Measles, combinations with mumps, rubella and varicella, live attenuated

J07BE Mumps vaccines
J07BE01 Mumps, live attenuated

J07BF Poliomyelitis vaccines
J07BF01 Poliomyelitis oral, monovalent live attenuated
J07BF02 Poliomyelitis oral, trivalent, live attenuated
J07BF03 Poliomyelitis, trivalent, inactivated, whole virus
J07BF04 Poliomyelitis oral, bivalent, live attenuated

J07BG Rabies vaccines
J07BG01 Rabies, inactivated, whole virus

J07BH Rotavirus diarrhea vaccines
J07BH01 Rotavirus, live attenuated
J07BH02 Rotavirus, pentavalent, live, reassorted

J07BJ Rubella vaccines
J07BJ01 Rubella, live attenuated
J07BJ51 Rubella, combinations with mumps, live attenuated

J07BK Varicella zoster vaccines
J07BK01 Varicella, live attenuated
J07BK02 Zoster, live attenuated
J07BK03 Zoster, purified antigen

J07BL Yellow fever vaccines
J07BL01 Yellow fever, live attenuated

J07BM Papillomavirus vaccines
J07BM01 Papillomavirus (human types 6, 11, 16, 18)
J07BM02 Papillomavirus (human types 16, 18)
J07BM03 Papillomavirus (human types 6, 11, 16, 18, 31, 33, 45, 52, 58)

J07BN Covid-19 vaccines
J07BN01 Covid-19, RNA-based vaccine
J07BN02 Covid-19, viral vector, non-replicating
J07BN03 Covid-19, inactivated virus
J07BN04 Covid-19, protein subunit

J07BX Other viral vaccines
J07BX01 Smallpox vaccines
J07BX02 Ebola vaccines
J07BX04 Dengue virus vaccines

J07C Bacterial and viral vaccines

J07CA Bacterial and viral vaccines, combined
J07CA01 Diphtheria-poliomyelitis-tetanus
J07CA02 Diphtheria-pertussis-poliomyelitis-tetanus
J07CA03 Diphtheria-rubella-tetanus
J07CA04 Hemophilus influenzae B and poliomyelitis
J07CA05 Diphtheria-hepatitis B-pertussis-tetanus
J07CA06 Diphtheria-hemophilus influenzae B-pertussis-poliomyelitis-tetanus
J07CA07 Diphtheria-hepatitis B-tetanus
J07CA08 Hemophilus influenzae B and hepatitis B
J07CA09 Diphtheria-hemophilus influenzae B-pertussis-poliomyelitis-tetanus-hepatitis B
J07CA10 Typhoid-hepatitis A
J07CA11 Diphtheria-Hemophilus influenzae B-pertussis-tetanus-hepatitis B
J07CA12 Diphtheria-pertussis-poliomyelitis-tetanus-hepatitis B
J07CA13 Diphtheria-hemophilus influenzae B-pertussis-tetanus-hepatitis B-meningococcus A + C

J07X Other vaccines

J07XA Parasitic vaccines
J07XA01 Malaria vaccines

See also
 Vaccines for veterinary use are in the ATCvet group QI.

References

J07